Bryan R. Collyer (born September 16, 1962) is an American professional stock car racing driver. He last competed part-time in the NASCAR Gander RV & Outdoors Truck Series, driving the No. 33 Chevrolet Silverado for Reaume Brothers Racing.

Racing career

Motorsports career results

NASCAR
(key) (Bold – Pole position awarded by qualifying time. Italics – Pole position earned by points standings or practice time. * – Most laps led.)

Gander RV & Outdoors Truck Series

References

External links
 

1962 births
Living people
NASCAR drivers
People from Ormond Beach, Florida
Racing drivers from Florida